Carrollton Township is one of twenty-one current townships in Carroll County, Arkansas, USA. As of the 2010 census, its total population was 716.

Carrollton Township was formed prior to 1870; the exact date is unknown since county records were lost.

Geography

Cities, towns, and villages
Alpena (part)
Carrollton (unincorporated)

References

 United States Census Bureau 2008 TIGER/Line Shapefiles

External links
 US-Counties.com
 City-Data.com

Townships in Carroll County, Arkansas
Townships in Arkansas